Veteran is a village in central Alberta, Canada.

History 
With the promise of land, many people made their way west to homestead in the Veteran area. Their ethnic origins were diverse but they shared in the optimism of a better life for themselves and their families.

Veteran incorporated as a village on June 30, 1914.

Demographics 

The population of the Village of Veteran according to its 2017 municipal census is 239.

In the 2016 Census of Population conducted by Statistics Canada, the Village of Veteran recorded a population of 207 living in 102 of its 112 total private dwellings, a  change from its 2011 population of 249.

Attractions 
Attractions in Veteran include a campground and a museum. Other facilities within the community include a library, a park, a playground and a skateboard park. Churches within Veteran include the Full Gospel Church and Veteran United Church.

A nearby large hill named Nose Hill has historical significance as it was a meeting spot during the second North-West Rebellion.

Sports 
Veteran has its own curling club with three sheets of ice as well as an arena.

Education 
Veteran School serves 60 students enrolled in kindergarten through grade 9. Senior high students attend school in Consort.

See also 
List of communities in Alberta
List of villages in Alberta

References

External links 

1914 establishments in Alberta
Special Area No. 4
Villages in Alberta